The Centre City Mall is the oldest existing and second largest shopping complex in Dunedin, New Zealand. Located in the central city, it is bounded by Great King Street and Castle Street in the block between St. Andrew's Street and Hanover Street, immediately to the south of Dunedin Hospital.

The mall, built in the late 1970s, contains 20 shops, with the key tenant being Dunedin's largest supermarket, Centre City New World. Other shops include several clothing retailers, chemists, a cafe, a musical instrument retailer, a health food store, craft shops, and a florist. The design of the centre (excluding New World) is roughly square and single-storeyed, with a block of shops in the centre of a corridor loop, with the other shops to the outside. The New World supermarket extends from the southeastern end of this square along Castle Street. To the north is the mall's car park, which also has a subterranean level beneath the mall itself.

A walkway, Albion Place, links Centre City with Dunedin's largest mall, the Meridian Mall.

References

Buildings and structures in Dunedin
Shopping centres in New Zealand
1970s architecture in New Zealand
Central Dunedin